Admiral Kharlamov was an  of the Russian Navy. It was named after admiral Nikolay Kharlamov.

Development and design 

Project 1155 dates to the 1970s when it was concluded that it was too costly to build large-displacement, multi-role combatants. The concept of a specialized surface ship was developed by Soviet designers.

Construction and career 
Admiral Kharlamov was laid down on 7 August 1986, and launched on 29 June 1988 by Yantar Shipyard in Kaliningrad. She was commissioned on 1 April 1990.

For the first 10 years, the ship served mostly making calls at foreign ports. She went to Sweden, Norway and Canada.

Between 30 June–5 July 1993, she paid a visit to the Canadian port of Halifax and between 7–11 July to the American port of Boston. Between 8–11 July 1994 Admiral Kharlamov visited the Dutch port of Rotterdam and also Norway. In 1996 and 1997, she was considered the best ship in the Russian Navy for anti-submarine warfare.

She was placed in reserve in 2006.

As of the end of 2019, Admiral Kharlamov was at the Nerpa plant awaiting either repair and modernization or disposal. She was withdrawn from the fleet in 2020 (St. Andrew's flag was lowered on 2 December) and is preparing for disposal at Nerpa Shipyard.

References 

1988 ships
Ships built at Yantar Shipyard
Cold War destroyers of the Soviet Union
Udaloy-class destroyers